Yizenia Aldama Miranda (born 1989) is a Cuban team handball goalkeeper. She has played on the Cuban national team, and participated at the 2011 World Women's Handball Championship in Brazil.

References

1989 births
Living people
Cuban female handball players
21st-century Cuban women